Naser may refer to:

Places
 Naser (river), better known as Nežárka, a river in South Bohemia, Czech Republic
 Naser, Khuzestan, a village in Khuzestan Province, Iran
 Naser, South Khorasan, a village in South Khorasan Province, Iran

Other
 Naser (name), name list
 Salwa Eid Naser (born 1998), Bahraini track sprinter
 Al Naser Sporting Club, a Kuwaiti professional football club

See also
Nasr (disambiguation)
Nasser (disambiguation)